2018 LAF season is the 19th edition of the first level American football championship in Russia, organized by FAFR (Federation of American Football), and it is the 3rd edition of the League of American Football.

Moscow Patriots is the defending champion.

Teams

Regular season
% = percentage of victories, GP = Games played, W = matches won,  L = lost games, GF = goals for, GA = Goals against

LAF Ural

LAF Center

Playoff

XIX Russkij Bowl

2018